Miranda Katherine Hart Dyke (born 14 December 1972) is an English actress and writer. Following drama training at the Academy of Live and Recorded Arts, Hart began writing material for the Edinburgh Fringe Festival and making appearances in various British sitcoms, including Hyperdrive (2006–2007) and Not Going Out (2006–2009).

Hart reached a wider audience with her self-driven semi-autobiographical BBC sitcom Miranda, which is based on her earlier BBC Radio 2 radio series Miranda Hart's Joke Shop (2008). The television sitcom ran for three series and several Christmas specials from 2009 to 2015, and earned her three Royal Television Society awards, four British Comedy Awards and four BAFTA nominations. From 2012 to 2015, she appeared as Camilla "Chummy" Fortescue-Cholmondeley-Browne in the BBC drama series Call the Midwife. She made her Hollywood debut in the action comedy film Spy (2015).

Hart has also written four books: Is It Just Me? (2012), a semi-autobiographical book; The Best of Miranda (2014), a compilation of scripts from the TV series; Peggy and Me (2016), a description of her life since owning her titular dog; and Miranda Hart's Daily Dose of Such Fun! (2017), in partnership with Comic Relief.

In 2017, Hart presented the Royal Variety Performance in the presence of the Duke and Duchess of Cambridge, making her the first solo female presenter in 105 years.

Early life

Family
Hart was born on 14 December 1972 in Torquay, Devon, the child of Captain David Hart Dyke and Diana Margaret Luce, daughter of Sir William Luce, Commander-in-Chief and Governor of Aden, and sister of Lord Luce. Hart is from an aristocratic background, but does not consider herself upper class, stating that her aunt and uncle live in a castle.

Her father was commanding officer of  when it was sunk during the 1982 Falklands conflict, and he was badly burned trying to escape the stricken warship. She has a younger sister, Alice Louisa Hart Dyke.

Education and training

Hart grew up in Petersfield, Hampshire. She was privately educated at Downe House, an independent boarding school for girls near Thatcham, Berkshire. She was a classmate and friend of the sports presenter Clare Balding, who was head girl. She attended the University of the West of England, Bristol, graduating with a 2:1 in political science. She then completed a postgraduate course in acting at the Academy of Live and Recorded Arts.

In 2002, she performed a solo show in Edinburgh, and in 2004 she pitched a comedy show to the BBC. At her read-through for BBC executives, Absolutely Fabulous writer and star Jennifer Saunders was present.

Career

Television
Before her own series was commissioned, Hart made appearances in various British sitcoms. In Not Going Out she initially appeared as an acupuncturist. However, her performance impressed producers so much that they wrote a regular role for her as Barbara, a sarcastic and clumsy cleaner. She continued to play the part until the production of Miranda in 2009. Hart earned a British Comedy Award nomination for her role as Teal in two series of the BBC television comedy sci-fi sitcom Hyperdrive, which ran from January 2006 to August 2007.

She also appeared in even smaller roles in French & Saunders, My Family and Other Animals, Nighty Night, Absolutely Fabulous, The Vicar of Dibley as a speed-date programmer, Lead Balloon, William and Mary, Smack the Pony (for which she wrote and performed in a couple of sketches and a number of video diaries), Stupid!, Monday Monday as Tall Karen, and as a minicab driver in the Channel 5 comedy Angelos, which ran for 6 episodes.

Hart is best known for her performance in her self-titled, self-penned and semi-autobiographical sitcom Miranda, which started recording for BBC Two in 2008 and began airing on 9 November 2009. The situation comedy also features Sarah Hadland, Tom Ellis, Patricia Hodge, James Holmes, and Sally Phillips. The series is based on Hart's semi-autobiographical writing and followed a television pilot and the BBC Radio 2 comedy Miranda Hart's Joke Shop. Described as an "old-fashioned" sitcom, it received positive comments from critics and Hart won the 2009 Royal Television Society award for comedy performance for her role in the first series.

A second series was commissioned and filming started in mid-2010. The series began airing on BBC Two and BBC HD on 15 November 2010. A third series began broadcasting from 26 December 2012 on BBC One. Repeats of the show have begun airing on UKTV Gold. She also presented a BBC spoof programme looking back over 2009 called 2009 Unwrapped with Miranda Hart. A similar show looking back over 2010 was also broadcast in December 2010. In 2014, she announced that her sitcom Miranda would come to an end after two final episodes due to air in December 2014.

She appeared as guest host of Have I Got News for You in October 2009, December 2010 and again in December 2011. On 27 December, she was a team member on Big Fat Quiz 2011, a quiz about the events of that year presented by Jimmy Carr, appearing alongside David Walliams (team blue). As a fan of the series, Hart has also appeared twice on Strictly Come Dancing: It Takes Two. On Boxing Day 2011, she appeared in an episode of Bear Grylls' Wild Weekend. She also scaled down one of the Alps with Bear Grylls in a show with him in March 2013. She has appeared on the Graham Norton Show 7 times, on 10 May and 3 December in 2010, 29 April 2011, 19 October 2012, 20 December 2013, 24 October 2014 and 8 May 2015. In January 2013, Hart appeared on Room 101 along with Reggie Yates and John Craven.

In 2012, Hart began to appear in the BBC One drama Call the Midwife, playing the character of "Camilla 'Chummy' Fortescue-Cholmondeley-Browne".

As part of the 60-year Diamond Jubilee celebrations, Hart co-presented a number of segments at the Diamond Jubilee Concert in 2012. In 2013, Hart presented a one-off interview show with her hero Bruce Forsyth entitled When Miranda Met Bruce.

In December 2013, Hart appeared in David Walliams' film adaptation of his book Gangsta Granny. She played Linda, Ben's mother. Also in December 2013, she was lined up to star in To Love, Honour and Betray (Till Divorce Do Us Part), the TV version of Kathy Lette's novel.

In December 2017, Hart took part in Celebrity Send To All in the third series of Michael McIntyre's Big Show.

In 2017, it was reported that her sitcom Miranda may return for a fourth series, and was said to be in the conception stage. However, in early 2018, Hart denied the rumours were true, stating that while she had "thought about" it, "that's all."

A 10th anniversary special of Miranda, filmed at the London Palladium in 2019 and described by Hart as "a party (not a new episode)", aired on BBC One on 1 January 2020.

Film
Hart played a cameo in David Baddiel's feature film The Infidel and appeared in World of Wrestling, a short film by Tim Plester, in which she played "Klondyke Kate", a wrestler billed as "hell in boots." The film was released in late 2007 alongside its companion shorts Blakes Junction 7 and Ant Muzak. Hart made a cameo appearance as a loan officer in the 2007 comedy film Magicians which featured David Mitchell and Robert Webb, both stars of the long running television series Peep Show.

In 2013, 12 in a Box was released, a feature film in which Hart plays a small role that was originally made in 2007. In 2015, she co-starred in the comedy film Spy, which was filmed on location in Budapest, Hungary. In 2020, Hart played "harmless chatterbox" Miss Bates in the Jane Austen adaptation film Emma., alongside Anya Taylor-Joy and Bill Nighy.

Radio
Her semi-autobiographical series Miranda Hart's Joke Shop was aired on BBC Radio 2 in 2008 and went on from there to be developed into the television series Miranda. Hart has also presented comedy specials for the network alongside Jon Holmes. In October 2011 she attracted criticism after co-hosting The Chris Evans Breakfast Show with Holmes while Chris Evans was on holiday. The website Digital Spy reported that some listeners were unhappy with the quality of the programme. The BBC issued a statement in response saying, "Miranda Hart is one of the UK's best-loved comedians and BBC Radio 2 felt it appropriate to bring her warmth to its audience for a week. Jon Holmes is a highly experienced presenter from BBC Radio 6 Music [...] BBC Radio 2 appreciates if their presentation wasn't to everyone's liking, but feels it's important to be able to bring new talent to its output and hopes its audience understands the importance of maintaining a breadth of content on the network."

Live performances
Avoiding the normal stand-up circuit for more character-based comedy, including an appearance in the Edinburgh and touring show The Sitcom Trials, Hart has written her own theatre material for the Edinburgh Fringe. Her one-woman shows include Miranda Hart – Throbs, It's All About Me and Miranda Hart's House Party. She also performed in Alecky Blythe's 2006 play Cruising at the Bush Theatre.

She was among the performers at the Diamond Jubilee concert held outside Buckingham Palace on 4 June 2012.

Hart embarked on her first tour in 2014, titled My, What I Call, Live Show, performing in arenas in the UK and Ireland. Tickets went on sale on 17 December 2012.

Comic Relief
Hart was the second contestant to be voted off the third series of Comic Relief does Fame Academy in 2007. Two years later, she appeared in the final sketch from comedy duo French and Saunders, which was broadcast during Red Nose Day 2009. In 2010, she and six other TV celebrities raised over £1 million for the charity Sport Relief cycling from John O'Groats to Land's End. She starred as a judge on both series two and three of Let's Dance for Comic Relief, alongside other guest judges including Kelly Brook, Rufus Hound and Louie Spence in 2010 and 2011.

In aid of Comic Relief, a Miranda mini-episode set in the world of Pineapple Dance Studios was broadcast on 18 March as part of Red Nose Day 2011. She took part in a Red Nose Day edition of Celebrity MasterChef in 2011, which she won. Hart also co-presented Sport Relief 2012, which concluded with her and fellow comedian David Walliams dancing semi-naked to ABBA's "Dancing Queen". She also donated a signed Miranda script to be auctioned in aid of Comic Relief.

Stage
It was announced in February 2017 that Hart would star as "Miss Hannigan" in the West End production of Annie.

Books
Hart released a book in October 2012 titled Is It Just Me?, featuring stories, anecdotes and life advice delivered in her own style. In January 2013 it was announced that she was writing a second book, called Peggy and Me, which was to be published on 9 October 2014, but was pushed back to 2015 and finally released in October 2016. The Best of Miranda, a compilation of scripts from the TV series Miranda, was published on 23 October 2014. In partnership with Comic Relief, Hart released a book called Miranda Hart's Daily Dose of Such Fun! in 2017, which featured something unique for the reader to do each day in the year. Also in 2017, she published The Girl with the Lost Smile, released in October.

Personal life
Hart is a Christian; she once said to fellow theist Victoria Coren Mitchell, "It's scary to say you're pro-God". She lives in Hammersmith, West London.

In her early twenties, Hart had an unsuccessful trial at Queens Park Rangers' women's team; she revealed this during Would I Lie to You. During a special guest exclusive on the BBC Red Button, her first guest was her friend Clare Balding who was head girl in their schooldays.

Filmography

Awards and nominations
In 2010, Hart won the Best Comedy Performance award from the Royal Television Society for her performance in Miranda and was also nominated for best comedy writing. She and Patricia Hodge were both nominated for "Best Comedy Actress" awards at the Monte-Carlo TV Festival 2010.

In 2011, she won "Best Comedy Actress" and "People's Choice Award for the King or Queen of Comedy" in the British Comedy Awards 2011, where Miranda also won "Best New British TV Comedy" and was nominated for "Best Sitcom". The same year, she was nominated for a BAFTA for Best Actress in a comedy role and her hit BBC Two sitcom Miranda was nominated for the BAFTA YouTube choice award, the only award voted for by the public.

Tours

Works and publications

Ancestry

Notes

References

External links
 
 
 
 Miranda Hart interview recorded at BAFTA London – June 2011

1972 births
21st-century English actresses
21st-century English women writers
Actresses from Devon
Actresses from Hampshire
Alumni of the Academy of Live and Recorded Arts
Alumni of the University of the West of England, Bristol
English autobiographers
English voice actresses
English film actresses
English television actresses
English Christians
English television producers
English television writers
English women comedians
Living people
People educated at Downe House School
People from Petersfield
Writers from Torquay
Women autobiographers
British comedy actresses
British women television producers
British television producers
British women television writers
21st-century British screenwriters
Actors from Torquay